The Lexus Song Quest (formerly known as the Mobil Song Quest) is a biennial opera singing competition, held in New Zealand since 1956. The competition is managed and presented by Tāwhiri, which also runs the New Zealand Festival of the Arts. Winners include the sopranos Dame Malvina Major and Dame Kiri Te Kanawa, both of whom were trained by Dame Sister Mary Leo. Other winners include Phillip Rhodes, Jonathan Lemalu and Sol3 Mio's Amitai Pati.

History 

First held in 1956, the Mobil Song Quest began as a radio contest. 1324 entries were made, with contestants recording a song at their local BCNZ radio station. The recorded works were then broadcaster in shows over 19 weeks.

Originally the quest featured contestants who performed songs in a variety of styles, such as country and western, pop and classical. Only more recently has the contest been primarily for opera singers, with the influence of Auckland opera singing teacher Dame Sister Mary Leo and the success of her students helping to shape the contest into a more prestigious singing competition.

From its beginning, the Song Quest was sponsored and run by Mobil Oil New Zealand. However, in 2004 the oil company passed the competition on to the New Zealand Festival of the Arts Trust. Mobil withdrew as the naming-rights sponsor, with Lexus stepping in to that role.

Past winners

References

External links 
 

New Zealand music
Lexus
Recurring events established in 1956
Opera competitions
Early career awards